The Syndicat de la Magistrature (SM; English: Magistrate's Union) is France's second largest magistrates' trade union in terms of membership after the more conservative Union syndicale des magistrats.

Political positions
Close to the left-wing parties such as the Socialist Party, it is in favour of a larger independence of the judiciary from the executive power, often criticising police brutality or harsh immigration laws. During the 2005 civil unrest in France, it criticised then-Interior Minister Nicolas Sarkozy's use of what it considered to be inappropriate language. The Syndicat de la Magistrature is member of Magistrats Européens pour la Démocratie et les Libertés (MEDEL), a progressive European NGO of judges and public prosecutors.

Mur des cons affair
The union was sentenced in 2019 by a Paris appellate court for public insults in what became known as the Mur des cons affair, in which right-wing politicians, comedians, journalists and generals were insulted by various members of the union, through a wall with pinned photographs and comments in the union's headquarters. The union has since lost some of its credibility, as its criticism of newly-appointed Justice Minister Éric Dupond-Moretti in 2020 was largely ignored by President Emmanuel Macron.

References

External links

Official website

Politics of France
Trade unions in France